Lachnoptera is a genus of butterflies in the family Nymphalidae.

Species

External links

"Lachnoptera Doubleday, [1847]" at Markku Savela's Lepidoptera and Some Other Life Forms

Vagrantini
Nymphalidae genera